Chancel Mangulu Mbemba (born 8 August 1994) is a Congolese professional footballer who plays as a defender for  club Marseille and the DR Congo national team.

Mbemba began his professional career Anderlecht, where he won the Belgian Pro League in his debut season of 2013–14. A year later, he moved to Newcastle United, where he played in the Premier League and won the Championship in 2017. In four years at Porto, he won the Primeira Liga and Taça de Portugal double in 2020 and 2022.

A full international for DR Congo since 2012, Mbemba has earned over 60 caps and represented the country at four Africa Cup of Nations tournaments, coming third in 2015.

Early life
Mbemba grew up in Kinshasa in a family of nine children. His mother, Antoinette, is a former basketball player who represented DR Congo.

A 2013 report by CNN found that documents support four different dates of birth for Mbemba from 1988 to 1994, with the player saying himself that he was born in 1990; an anonymous member of the Congolese Association Football Federation said that his date of birth was changed to 1991 so that he would be eligible for the 2012 Olympics where players must be under 23. Upon signing for Newcastle, he said that he was born in 1994 and that there was forensic proof.

Club career

Anderlecht
After playing youth football for several clubs including E.S. La Grace and FC MK Etanchéité in Kinshasa, Mbemba joined Belgian club Anderlecht in 2012. Upon moving, he mainly played with Anderlecht reserve and youth teams, and requested to have a bone scan to dispel rumours that he was older than he actually was.  

On 21 July 2013, Mbemba was an unused substitute as Anderlecht won the Belgian Super Cup 1–0 against Genk. He made his debut a week later in their opening match of the Belgian Pro League season, a 3–2 home defeat to Lokeren. He scored five goals in 35 games of a league-winning campaign, starting by concluding a 2–0 win at Mons on 18 October, a contribution to becoming the league's Player of the Month.

Mbemba played in the 2014 Belgian Super Cup, a 2–1 win over Lokeren. he made 28 appearances during the 2014–15 season as they finished in third spot in the league, and runners-up in the 2014–15 Belgian Cup, losing 1–2 to Club Brugge in the final.

Newcastle United

On 26 July 2015, Premier League side Newcastle United announced the signing of Mbemba. Four days later, he signed a five-year contract with the club. He made his debut on 9 August on the first day of the Premier League season, starting in a 2–2 home draw with Southampton.

He scored his only goal for the club on 7 May 2017 against Barnsley in a 3–0 home win, on the same day that Newcastle clinched the EFL Championship title a year after relegation.

Porto
On 23 July 2018, Primeira Liga side Porto signed Mbemba for a reported £7.14 million fee. He made his debut on 31 October in a 4–2 home win over Varzim in the group stage of the Taça da Liga, with manager Sérgio Conceição sending out a completely different team to the previous league game. Four days later he made his Primeira Liga bow as an 80th-minute substitute for striker Yacine Brahimi in a 2–0 victory at Marítimo; he played only two more league games that season, one of which was a start in a 3–1 win over Nacional at the Estádio do Dragão on 7 January 2019. He also played two matches for the reserve team in LigaPro.

Mbemba scored his first goal for the Dragons on 24 November 2019, opening a 4–0 home win over Vitória de Setúbal that qualified his team to the last 16 of the Taça de Portugal. The following 7 March, he was on the scoreboard for the first time in the league, in a 1–1 draw with Rio Ave at the same venue; his team ended the season as champions. On 1 August 2020, Mbemba scored both goals of a 2–1 win over Benfica in the Taça de Portugal Final.

Marseille
On 15 July 2022, Mbemba signed a three-year contract with Marseille on a free transfer. He made his debut on 7 August as the Ligue 1 season began with a 4–1 home win over Reims, and scored his first goal in his third game on 20 August to open a 2–1 win over Nantes also at the Stade Vélodrome. On 7 September, he was sent off in a 2–0 Champions League loss at Tottenham Hotspur for a professional foul on Son Heung-min.

International career
Mbemba made his debut for the DR Congo on 17 June 2012, in a 3–0 home win over the Seychelles at the Stade des Martyrs in Kinshasa, in 2013 Africa Cup of Nations qualification. He was an unused member of Claude Le Roy's squad for the finals. He was part of the squad that came third at the 2015 Africa Cup of Nations in Equatorial Guinea, and scored a penalty in the shootout win over the hosts for the bronze medal.

On 13 October 2015, Mbemba scored his first international goal, a late long-distance winner in a 2–1 friendly against Gabon in Visé, Belgium. He also went to the Africa Cup of Nations in 2017 and 2019; in the latter in Egypt he scored a late header in a 2–2 draw with Madagascar in the last 16, though his team lost in a shootout.

Career statistics

Club

International

Scores and results list DR Congo's goal tally first, score column indicates score after each Mbemba goal.

Honours

Anderlecht
Belgian Pro League: 2013–14
Belgian Super Cup: 2013, 2014

Newcastle United
EFL Championship: 2016–17

Porto
Primeira Liga: 2019–20 2021–22
Taça de Portugal: 2019–20, 2021–22
Supertaça Cândido de Oliveira: 2020

DR Congo
Africa Cup of Nations bronze: 2015

Individual
Primeira Liga Defender of the Month: January 2022
Primeira Liga Team of the Year: 2021–22

References

External links 

 
 Chancel Mbemba Mangulu's profile at RSCA.be
 

Living people
Footballers from Kinshasa
Democratic Republic of the Congo footballers
Democratic Republic of the Congo international footballers
Belgian Pro League players
Premier League players
English Football League players
Primeira Liga players
Liga Portugal 2 players
Ligue 1 players
FC MK Etanchéité players
R.S.C. Anderlecht players
Newcastle United F.C. players
FC Porto players
FC Porto B players
Olympique de Marseille players
Democratic Republic of the Congo expatriate footballers
Democratic Republic of the Congo expatriate sportspeople in Belgium
Expatriate footballers in Belgium
Democratic Republic of the Congo expatriate sportspeople in England
Expatriate footballers in England
Democratic Republic of the Congo expatriate sportspeople in Portugal
Expatriate footballers in Portugal
Democratic Republic of the Congo expatriate sportspeople in France
Expatriate footballers in France
Association football defenders
1994 births
2013 Africa Cup of Nations players
2015 Africa Cup of Nations players
2017 Africa Cup of Nations players
2019 Africa Cup of Nations players
Age controversies
21st-century Democratic Republic of the Congo people